Do Cheshmeh (also known as Kaleh Khān, Kalleh Khān, Kela Khān, and Qal‘eh Khān) is a village in Tariq ol Eslam Rural District, in the Central District of Nahavand County, Hamadan Province, Iran. At the 2006 census, its population was 710, in 169 families.

References 

Populated places in Nahavand County